Chaheh (also Romanized as Chāheh; also known as Chāhā and Chāhheh) is a village in Jam Rural District, in the Central District of Jam County, Bushehr Province, Iran. At the 2006 census, its population was 1,879, in 225 families.

References 

Populated places in Jam County